Todd Michael McClay (born 22 November 1968) is a New Zealand politician and former ambassador. He is the Member of Parliament for Rotorua. He was previously an ambassador for the Cook Islands and Niue to the European Union.

Early life 
McClay was born in Rotorua in 1968. The son of former National MP Roger McClay, he was educated at Tauhara College in Taupo, Wesley College in Auckland and Wellington Polytechnic in Wellington. He gained a bachelor's degree in Politics.

European Union diplomatic career 
McClay worked in the European Parliament as Head of Staff to Lord Plumb, President of the European Parliament and Leader of the British Conservatives in the European Parliament. He has also been active in European government affairs and lobbying and was a founder and CEO of a company, Political Relationship Management. McClay has been active in Pacific Islands, European and New Zealand diplomacy and politics since 1992, and was the Cook Islands' first accredited diplomat outside of the Pacific region. He remains the youngest-ever appointed Head of Mission to the European Union.

In 2000 the Cook Islands joined the Cotonou Agreement between the EU and African, Caribbean and Pacific states (ACP) and he was appointed as special representative of the Cook Islands. In 2002 the Cook Islands government upgraded its representation to the level of diplomatic mission, at which time McClay was appointed Ambassador to the EU. He has represented the Cook Islands at many international meetings and conferences, including the WTO, FAO, ACP, EU and UN.

Member of Parliament

First term, 2008–2011
In 2008, McClay was selected as the National Party candidate to stand for the Rotorua electorate in the 2008 New Zealand general election, running against incumbent Labour MP Steve Chadwick. McClay won the seat of Rotorua on election night with a majority of 5,065 (15.43%). He was sworn in as a Member of Parliament on 8 December 2008.

In 2009 his Shop Trading Hours Act 1990 Repeal (Easter Sunday Local Choice) Amendment Bill was drawn from the ballot.  The bill would have allowed local authorities to permit shops to open on Easter Sunday – something currently prohibited in most of New Zealand. The bill was narrowly defeated at its first reading.

Second term, 2011–2014
In 2011, McClay was reelected as the Member of Parliament for Rotorua increasing his majority to 7,357 votes.

In late June 2012, McClay announced his intention to bring a bill before Parliament to prohibit the display of gang insignia in all government premises, schools and hospitals in New Zealand. Modeled on the Whanganui Gang Insignia Act, McClay's announcement was met with strong public support.  The Bill received Royal Assent on 12 August 2013 and became law the day after.

On 30 August 2012, McClay voted against the Marriage (Definition of Marriage) Amendment Bill, a bill allowing same-sex couples to marry in New Zealand.

In 2013 he was appointed Minister of Revenue and Associate Minister of Health, serving outside of Cabinet.

In January 2014, he was appointed Associate Minister for Tourism.

Third term, 2014–2017
In September 2014, McClay was again elected as Member of Parliament for Rotorua with an increased majority of 7,418, after beating Labour candidate and former TV weatherman, Tāmati Coffey.

Following the 2014 election, McClay was promoted to Cabinet retaining his position as Minister of Revenue, while picking up the portfolios of State-Owned Enterprises, Associate Minister of Foreign Affairs and Associate Minister of Trade.

Following the resignation of former Trade Minister Tim Groser, McClay became Minister of Trade on 14 December 2015. He retained State Owned Enterprises and Associate Foreign Affairs, while handing over Inland Revenue to Michael Woodhouse.

In late July 2016, McClay was rebuked by Prime Minister John Key for downplaying concerns that China would retaliate if New Zealand undertook an investigation of Chinese steel dumping.

In 2017, McClay represented his party in Beijing before a dialogue organised by the International Liaison Department of the Communist Party of China (CCP). McClay also referred to the Xinjiang re-education camps as "vocational training centers" in line with CCP talking points.

Fourth term, 2017–2020
During the 2017 general election, McClay retained Rotorua for National by a margin of 7,901 votes.

In late August 2019, former National MP Jami-Lee Ross alleged that McClay had helped to facilitate a NZ$150,000 to the National Party in his capacity as Trade Minister in 2016 from a company owned by Chinese millionaire Lin Lang. McClay and the National Party have denied these allegations.

Fifth term, 2020–present
During the 2020 general election, McClay retained his seat in Rotorua by a final margin of 825 votes.

McClay was one of only eight MPs to vote against the Conversion Practices Prohibition Legislation Act 2022. He voted against it at its first reading (which then-party-leader Judith Collins instructed her MPs to do), for it at its second reading, and against it at its third and final reading.

Following a reshuffle in party leader Christopher Luxon's shadow cabinet on 19 January 2023, McClay was given the new Hunting and Fishing portfolio. He retained his 16th place ranking within Luxon's shadow cabinet.

Personal life
He lives in Rotorua with his wife, Nadene, and their four children.

References

External links

 National Party biography
 How to get in touch with Todd

1968 births
Living people
Ambassadors of New Zealand to the European Union
New Zealand National Party MPs
People from Rotorua
Ambassadors of the Cook Islands to the European Union
Ambassadors of Niue to the European Union
People educated at Wesley College, Auckland
Government ministers of New Zealand
Members of the New Zealand House of Representatives
New Zealand MPs for North Island electorates
Members of the Cabinet of New Zealand
21st-century New Zealand politicians
People educated at Tauhara College
Candidates in the 2017 New Zealand general election